Ugh or UGH may  refer to:
Ugh!, a computer game
"UGH!" (song), by The 1975
 "Ugh" (SpongeBob SquarePants), a 2004 TV episode
"Ugh! Your Ugly Houses!," a 1995 single by British alternative music band Chumbawamba
"Ugh Ugh Ugh", a song by rapper Juicy J from his 2009 album Hustle Till I Die

See also
UG (disambiguation)
UGG (disambiguation)